This is a list of adult fiction books that topped The New York Times Fiction Best Seller list in 1962. Four books topped the list that year, the longest on top being Ship of Fools by Katherine Anne Porter, which spent exactly half the year there - from April 29 to November 11, its last week at the top - though it continued in the top 15 best sellers for another 20 weeks. Franny and Zooey by J. D. Salinger started the year at the top of the list carrying over from 1961, where it entered the top spot on October 25. In all Salinger's book spent 25 continuous weeks in the top spot. The list was interrupted at the end of the year by the 1962–63 New York City newspaper strike which lasted 114 days and had a profound impact on the newspaper industry in New York.

References

1962
.
1962 in the United States